Antyukh or Antukh (Cyrillic: Антюх or Антух) is a gender-neutral Belarusian  surname derived from the masculine given name Anton. 
The surname may refer to the following notable people:
Denys Antyukh (born 1997), Ukrainian football midfielder
Kirill Antyukh (born 1986), Russian bobsledder
 Natalya Antyukh (born 1981), Russian sprint runner

References

Belarusian-language surnames